Beyhan (also: Beyhanı) is a town (belde) in Palu District, Elazığ Province, Turkey. Its population is 1,940 (2021). The Beyhan I Dam is situated near the town.

References

Towns in Turkey
Populated places in Elazığ Province
Palu District